The National Council is according to the Constitution of Slovenia the representative of social, economic, professional and local interest groups in Slovenia and has a legislative function working as a corrective mechanism of the National Assembly, although it does not itself pass acts. It may be regarded as the upper house, but the bicameralism is distinctively incomplete. It is not elected directly by the population, but meant to represent different interest groups in the country. The councillors are elected for a five-year term.

The current President of the National Council is Alojz Kovšca from 12 December 2017.

Composition 
The council has 40 members:

 22 representatives of local interests, 
 6 representatives of non-commercial activities, 
 4 representatives of employers, 
 4 of employees, 
 4 representatives of farmers, crafts, trades and independent professionals.

Presidents of the National Council 

 Ivan Kristan (LDS): 23 December 1992 – 17 December 1997
 Tone Hrovat (SLS): 17 December 1997 – 17 December 2002
 Janez Sušnik (DeSUS): 17 December 2002 – 12 December 2007
 Blaž Kavčič (LDS / SMS-Zeleni): 12 December 2007 – 12 December 2012
 Mitja Bervar (LDS / SMC) 12 December 2012 – 12 December 2017
 Alojz Kovšca (GAS / Concretely) 12 December 2017 – present

References

External links
 

Slovenian Parliament
National upper houses
Organizations based in Ljubljana
1992 establishments in Slovenia